Parennea is a genus of air-breathing land snails, terrestrial pulmonate gastropod mollusks in the family Streptaxidae.

Distribution 
The distribution of the genus Parennea is Afrotropical.

Species
Species within the genus Parennea include:

References

Further reading 
 Adam W. & van Goethem J. L. (1978). Revision du sous-genre Parennea Pilsbry du Genre Ptychotrema Morch (Mollusca-Pulmonata-Streptaxidae)". Études du Continent Africain, Bruxelles 5: 1-79.
 Bruggen A. C. van (1989) "Studies on Parennea (Mollusca, Gastropoda Pulmonata, Streptaxidae) additional to the revision by Adam & van Goethem, 1978". Proceedings of the Koninklijke Nederlandse Akademie van Wetenschappen (series C) 92: 1-56.

Streptaxidae